Alexander Prokopyev (born August 5, 1986, in Biysk) is a Russian political figure and a deputy of the 6th, 7th, and 8th State Dumas. 

Prokopyev's mother, Larisa Prokopyeva, is a famous Russian entrepreneur and the founder of the Evalar company specializing in  dietary supplements. After graduating from the First Moscow State Medical University, Alexander Prokopyev started working at the Evalar. In 2008-2011, he was responsible for the strategic development of the company. In 2011, he was elected deputy of the 6th State Duma from the Altai Krai constituency. In 2016 and 2021, Prokopyev was re-elected for the 7th and 8th State Dumas.

In 2012, Forbes ranked Prokopyev 37th out of 100 wealthiest civil servants in Russia. In 2017 and 2020, he became the richest of all Siberian deputies in the State Duma with an annual income of 92-108 mln rubles.

References

1986 births
Living people
United Russia politicians
21st-century Russian politicians
Eighth convocation members of the State Duma (Russian Federation)
Seventh convocation members of the State Duma (Russian Federation)
Sixth convocation members of the State Duma (Russian Federation)